Tartanry is the stereotypical or kitsch representation of traditional Scottish culture, particularly by the emergent Scottish tourist industry in the 18th and 19th centuries, and later by the American film industry.  The earliest use of the word "tartanry" itself is said to have been in 1976. The phenomenon was explored in Scotch Myths, a culturally influential exhibition devised by Barbara and Murray Grigor and Peter Rush and mounted at the Crawford Centre at the University of St. Andrews in the Spring of 1981.

Definition
Tartanry is the perceived reduction of Scottish culture to kitsch, twee, distorted imagery based on ethnic stereotypes. Often the image presented is that of the Highlander as noble savage. While there are strong, legitimate cultural traditions behind Scottish clan societies and the older textile designs that preceded the modern tartans and kilts, and instruments like bagpipes are a part of the living musical traditions, Tartanry is when these things are tokenized, caricatured, or attached to fabricated histories. While Scottish Gaelic is a living language, that has developed and grown with modern culture, tartanry presents it as a dead relic and curiosity, and those acting from this perspective may simply redefine words, or change their spellings to gibberish, for no other reason than to appear quaint or exotic.

Tartanry is defined by literary scholar Cairns Craig as, "the false glamour that Scott had foisted on Scotland and which had turned it into Brigadoon."

History

Modern historians suggest that due to economic and social change, the clan system in the Highlands was already declining by the time of the failed 1745 rising. In its aftermath the British government enacted a series of laws that attempted to speed the process, including a ban on the bearing of arms, the wearing of tartan (in the Dress Act 1746) and limitations on the activities of the Roman Catholic Church. Most of the legislation was repealed by the end of the eighteenth century as the Jacobite threat subsided. There was soon a process of the rehabilitation of Highland culture. The Dress Act was repealed in 1782, and tartan was adopted for Highland regiments in the British army, which poor Highlanders joined in large numbers until the end of the Napoleonic Wars in 1815. However, by the nineteenth century tartan had largely been abandoned by the ordinary people.

In the 1820s, as part of the Romantic revival, tartan and the kilt were adopted by members of the social elite, not just in Scotland, but across Europe. The international craze for tartan, and for idealising a romanticised Highlands, was set off by the Ossian cycle published by Scottish poet James Macpherson in 1761-2. Sir Walter Scott's Waverley novels further helped popularise select aspects of Scottish life and history and he founded the Celtic Society of Edinburgh in 1820. He staged the royal Visit of King George IV to Scotland in 1822 and the king's wearing of tartan. George IV was the first reigning monarch to visit Scotland in 171 years. Scott and the Celtic Society urged Scots to attend festivities "all plaided and plumed in their tartan array". One contemporary writer sarcastically described the pomp that surrounded the celebrations as "Sir Walter's Celtified Pageantry". Nevertheless, the result was a massive upsurge in demand for kilts and tartans that could not be met by the Scottish textile industry.

Lord Macaulay, son of an Argyll family, wrote of the Romantic reinvention of Highland customs:

The designation of individual clan tartans was largely defined in this period and they became a major symbol of Scottish identity. The fashion for all things Scottish was maintained by Queen Victoria, who helped secure the popularity of the tartan fashion and the identity of Scotland as a tourist destination. Her Highland enthusiasm led to the design of two new tartan patterns, “Victoria” and “Balmoral”. The latter was named after her castle Balmoral in Aberdeenshire, which from 1852 became a major royal residence.

See also
 Brigadoon
 Plastic Paddy
 List of tartans
 Scottish national identity
 Symbolic ethnicity
 Vestiarium Scoticum
 Visit of King George IV to Scotland
 White Heather Club
 Xenophobia

References

Cultural history of Scotland
Parodies
Stereotypes